Harp Lake is a lake in north-central Labrador, Canada.

Labrador
Lakes of Newfoundland and Labrador